Real estate development, or property development, is a business process, encompassing activities that range from the renovation and re-lease of existing buildings to the purchase of raw land and the sale of developed land or parcels to others. Real estate developers are the people and companies who coordinate all of these activities, converting ideas from paper to real property. Real estate development is different from construction or housebuilding, although many developers also manage the construction process or engage in housebuilding.

Developers buy land, finance real estate deals, build or have builders build projects, develop projects in joint venture, create, imagine, control, and orchestrate the process of development from the beginning to end. Developers usually take the greatest risk in the creation or renovation of real estate and receive the greatest rewards. Typically, developers purchase a tract of land, determine the marketing of the property, develop the building program and design, obtain the necessary public approval and financing, build the structures, and rent out, manage, and ultimately sell it.

Sometimes property developers will only undertake part of the process. For example, some developers source a property and get the plans and permits approved before selling the property with the plans and permits to a builder at a premium price. Alternatively, a developer that is also a builder may purchase a property with the plans and permits in place so that they do not have the risk of failing to obtain planning approval and can start construction on the development immediately.

Developers work with many different counterparts along each step of this process, including architects, city planners, engineers, surveyors, inspectors, contractors, lawyers, leasing agents, etc. In the Town and Country Planning context in the United Kingdom, 'development' is defined in the Town and Country Planning Act 1990 s55.

Organizing for development
A development team can be put together in one of several ways.  At one extreme, a large company might include many services, from architecture to engineering.  At the other end of the spectrum, a development company might consist of one principal and a few staff who hire or contract with other companies and professionals for each service as needed.

Assembling a team of professionals to address the environmental, economic, private, physical and political issues inherent in a complex development project is critical. A developer's success depends on the ability to coordinate and lead the completion of a series of interrelated activities efficiently and at the appropriate time.

Development process requires skills of many professionals: architects, landscape architects, civil engineers and site planners to address project design; market consultants to determine demand and a project's economics; attorneys to handle agreements and government approvals; environmental consultants and soils engineers to analyze a site's physical limitations and environmental impacts; surveyors and title companies to provide legal descriptions of a property; and lenders to provide financing. The general contractor of the project hires subcontractors to put the architectural plans into action.

Land development

Purchasing unused land for a potential development is sometimes called speculative development.

Subdivision of land is the principal mechanism by which communities are developed.  Technically, subdivision describes the legal and physical steps a developer must take to convert raw land into developed land.  Subdivision is a vital part of a community's growth, determining its appearance, the mix of its land uses, and its infrastructure, including roads, drainage systems, water, sewerage, and public utilities.

Land development can pose the most risk, but can also be the most profitable technique as it is dependent on the public sector for approvals and infrastructure and because it involves a long investment period with no positive cash flow.

After subdivision is complete, the developer usually markets the land to a home builder or other end user, for such uses as a warehouse or shopping center. In any case, use of spatial intelligence tools mitigate the risk of these developers by modeling the population trends and demographic make-up of the sort of customers a home builder or retailer would like to have surrounding their new development.

See also 
 Brownfield regulation and development
 Gentrification
 Land consumption
 Property investment calculator
 Real estate bubble
 Real estate business
 Shared ranch
 Urban sprawl

References

 
Architecture
Construction
Real estate